The Nariño tapaculo (Scytalopus vicinior) is a species of bird in the family Rhinocryptidae. It is found in Colombia and Ecuador.

Taxonomy and systematics

The Nariño tapaculo was originally described as a subspecies of Tacarcuna tapaculo (Scytalopus panamensis) and was retained there until after Krabbe and Schulenberg (1997) noted "no particular similarity, either in plumage or in voice, between true S. vicinior and S. panamensis".

Description

The Nariño tapaculo looks similar to several other Andean tapaculos. The male's head is dark gray, the back is dark gray or brown, and the rump is cinnamon with dusky bars. The throat, chest, and belly are lighter gray and the flanks and vent area are yellowish brown with blackish bars. The female is similar, but the back is browner, the throat is lighter gray, and the lower belly sometimes yellower.

Distribution and habitat

The Nariño tapaculo is found on the west slope of the Andes from Colombia's Risaralda and Chocó Departments south to southwestern Cotopaxi Province in Ecuador. There it primarily inhabits the understory of moist montane forest and sometimes forest edges.

Behavior

The Nariño tapaculo preys on a variety of insects, but little more is known about its feeding phenology. Little is also known about its breeding behavior other than that breeding condition specimens were collected in November, December, and April.

The Nariño tapaculo's song is "a fast series of well-enunciated, ringing notes that starts out with a brief stutter but then may go on for 15-30 seconds, pididi-ü--ü--ü--ü--ü--ü--ü--ü--ü--ü--ü" .

Status

The IUCN has assessed the Nariño tapaculo as being of Least Concern. Despite its somewhat small range and unknown population numbers, both are believed large enough to warrant that classification.

References

Nariño tapaculo
Birds of the Colombian Andes
Birds of the Ecuadorian Andes
Nariño tapaculo
Nariño tapaculo
Taxonomy articles created by Polbot